Death Peak is the eighth studio album by British electronic musician Chris Clark and the sixth one under the moniker Clark. Announced on 17 February 2017, it was released on 7 April 2017 by Warp Records. Upon its announcement its first single, "Peak Magnetic", was released freely for streaming on SoundCloud. The design of the album cover is that of a crumpled photograph of Clark himself, produced by photographer Alma Haser.

It peaked at number 11 on the UK Dance Albums Chart and number 20 on the UK Independent Albums Chart.

Critical reception

At Metacritic, which assigns a weighted average score out of 100 to reviews from mainstream critics, the album received an average score of 78, based on 13 reviews, indicating "generally favorable reviews". Mike Schiller of PopMatters gave the album 7 stars out of 10, saying: "Death Peak is a very good album, and anyone who's followed Clark since Clarence Park should be happy with the twists and turns he continues to take." Paul Clarke of Resident Advisor gave the album a 4.0 out of 5, describing the music on the album as IDM, techno and ambient, saying: "A large part of Death Peak—despite the morbid title—contains some of Clark's most accessible and melodic dance floor tracks." Loud and Quiets Luke Cartledge, in his positive review, praised the album for possessing "bizarre, profound (and not always entirely pleasant) impact." Clash rated the album 7 out of 10 portraying the album as "nine-track barrage of industrial experimentalism." The publication  named it the 33rd best album of 2017.

Track listing
Track listing taken from Bleep.com.

Personnel
Credits adapted from the liner notes of Death Peak.

Additional musicians
 Barnby Road Academy Chamber Choir – choir 
 Lizzie Greeley – leader 
 Yamila Ríos – vocals

Technical personnel
 Christopher Stephen Clark – production, mastering
 Joel Krozer – additional mastering
 Naweed – additional mastering

Artwork
 Dominic Flannigan – design
 Alma Haser – illustration, photography

Charts

References

External links
 

2017 albums
Clark (musician) albums
Warp (record label) albums